Bis(benzene)chromium is the organometallic compound with the formula Cr(η6-C6H6)2.  It is sometimes called dibenzenechromium. The compound played an important role in the development of sandwich compounds in organometallic chemistry and is the prototypical complex containing two arene ligands.

Preparation
The substance is air sensitive and its synthesis requires air-free techniques.  It was first prepared by Hafner and Fischer by the reaction of CrCl3, aluminium, and benzene, in the presence of AlCl3. This so-called reductive Friedel-Crafts method was pioneered by E.O. Fischer and his students.  The product of the reaction was yellow [Cr(C6H6)2]+, which was then reduced to the neutral complex.  Idealized equations for the synthesis are:
 CrCl3  +  2/3Al  +  1/3AlCl3  +  2C6H6  →  [Cr(C6H6)2]AlCl4
 [Cr(C6H6)2]AlCl4  +  1/2Na2S2O4  →  [Cr(C6H6)2]  +  NaAlCl4  +  SO2
Using the technique of metal vapor synthesis, bis(benzene)chromium and many analogous compounds can be prepared by co-condensation of Cr vapor and arene.  In this way, the phosphabenzene complex [Cr(C5H5P)2] can be prepared.

Structure elucidation
Compounds closely related to [Cr(C6H6)2]+ had been prepared many years before Fischer's work by Franz Hein by the reaction of phenylmagnesium bromide and CrCl3.  Hein's reaction affords cationic sandwich complexes containing bi- and terphenyl, which baffled chemists until the breakthrough by Fischer and Hafner.  (Indeed, although Harold Zeiss and Minoru Tsutsui of Yale University had earlier proposed the "sandwich" structure, they were unable to convince skeptical journal referees to publish their manuscript until Fischer and Hafner's results were made known.) Fischer and Seus soon prepared Hein's [Cr(C6H5-C6H5)2]+ by an unambiguous route, thus confirming that Hein had unknowingly discovered sandwich complexes, a half-century ahead of the work on ferrocene. Illustrating the rapid pace of this research, the same issue of Chem. Ber. also describes the Mo(0) complex.

Reactions
The compound reacts with carboxylic acids to give chromium(II) carboxylates, such as chromium(II) acetate, which have interesting structures.  Oxidation affords [Cr(C6H6)2]+.  Carbonylation gives (benzene)chromium tricarbonyl.

The compound finds limited use in organic synthesis.

References

Organochromium compounds
Sandwich compounds